Ayhan Çiçek (born 10 January 1978) is a Turkish weightlifter. He competed in the men's middleweight event at the 2000 Summer Olympics.

References

1978 births
Living people
Turkish male weightlifters
Olympic weightlifters of Turkey
Weightlifters at the 2000 Summer Olympics
Place of birth missing (living people)